The 2015–16 Eastern Washington Eagles men's basketball team represented Eastern Washington University during the 2015–16 NCAA Division I men's basketball season. The Eagles were led by fifth-year head coach Jim Hayford and played their home games at Reese Court. They were members of the Big Sky Conference. They finished the season 18–16, 10–6 in Big Sky play to finish in a tie for fifth place. They defeated Northern Arizona in the first round of the Big Sky tournament to advance to the quarterfinals where they lost to Idaho. They were invited to the College Basketball Invitational where they defeated Pepperdine to advance to the quarterfinals where they lost to Nevada.

Previous season
The Eagles finished the season 26–9, 14–4 in Big Sky play to finish in a share for the regular season Big Sky championship. They defeated Idaho, Sacramento State, and Montana to be champions of the Big Sky tournament. They received an automatic bid to the NCAA tournament where they lost in the second round to Georgetown.

Departures

Incoming Transfers

2015 incoming recruits

Roster

Schedule
 

|-
!colspan=9 style="background:#a10022; color:#FFFFFF;"| Non-conference regular season

|-
!colspan=9 style="background:#a10022; color:#FFFFFF;"| Big Sky regular season

|-
!colspan=9 style="background:#a10022; color:#FFFFFF;"| Big Sky tournament

|-
!colspan=9 style="background:#a10022; color:#FFFFFF;"| CBI

See also
2015–16 Eastern Washington Eagles women's basketball team

References

Eastern Washington Eagles men's basketball seasons
Eastern Washington
Eastern Washington
Eastern Washington
Eastern Washington